Kars4Kids is a Jewish nonprofit car donation organization based in Lakewood, New Jersey in the United States. Kars4Kids is a 501(c)(3) nonprofit organization that states that its mission is "to fund educational, developmental and recreational programs for low-income youth" through programs largely facilitated by its sister charity Oorah, which focuses on Jewish children and families. It was founded in 1994 and is currently headed by Eliyohu Mintz.

Nationwide locations in which the organization hosts coat and clothing giveaways for the needy include Newark, New Jersey, Harlem and Washington, D.C.

Background
Kars4Kids is a nonprofit organization with 501(c)(3) status, operating in the United States and Canada. Kars4Kids takes donations of cars, boats, yachts and real estate, accepting over 40,000 cars annually.

In 2018, Kars4Kids reported revenue of $65.6 million and expenses of $59.8 million.

Donations to Kars4Kids benefit Oorah, a national nonprofit organization whose stated mission is "to give Jewish children and their families opportunities to become active and productive members of their communities".

Work
Kars4Kids offers financial assistance to students to help pay for private school tuition and GED testing. The organization also sponsors a youth program known as Chillzone, an after-school program teaching Jewish culture and moral values. Additionally, they sponsor the summer camp TheZone, which operates Jewish sleepaway camps in the upper Catskills region of New York State. They also offer small grants to other nonprofit organizations, and in 2016 Kars4Kids awarded $5,000 to Girls on the Run International.

The organization hosts regular coat and clothing giveaways for the needy nationwide, including in Harlem, New York, Washington, D.C., and in Newark, New Jersey, where they held a give-away together with then-Newark Mayor (and current U.S. Senator) Cory Booker.

Prior to the start of the 2012 school year, the Chairman of the New York City Housing Authority in partnership with Kars4Kids distributed school supplies and backpacks to more than 3,000 children in Queens housing projects. Around that same time period with New York City Councilman James Vacca, they distributed free backpacks in the Bronx as part of a "back-to-school initiative aimed at helping struggling families with the rising expenses of school supplies." In Brooklyn, Congressman Ed Towns and Kars4Kids distributed winter jackets to underprivileged children, including at the Marcy Avenue Houses.

The organization saw a boom in donated cars following Hurricane Sandy, with owners donating cars totaled by hurricane damage.

After being contacted by the New York Police Department, the charity auctioned off a 2003 Ford Explorer in which two children drowned after being swept from their mother's arms during Hurricane Sandy. The auction proceeds went to raise money for coats for the needy. Kars 4 Kids worked with United States Representative Michael Grimm to distribute over 1,000 children's coats and other assorted clothing items to Staten Island residents affected by the hurricane.

In 2014, Kars4Kids released an app for Android, Kars4Kids Safety, which aims to prevent accidental deaths of children left in hot cars, by providing reminders to their parents. The app syncs with the car's Bluetooth technology, to set off an automatic alert when the phone's Bluetooth disconnects from the car's.

Kars4Kids also accepts donations of real estate and land donations.

Ratings
Kars4Kids receives Charity Navigator's "good" rating of three out of a possible four stars.

Song

The group's director of public relations stated that the song was written in the late 1990s by a volunteer, with music adapted from Country Yossi's song "Little Kinderlach". The jingle was first used in radio commercials broadcast in the New York City area, by 2004 the ads began to play in other markets such as Chicago, and later nationally as part of radio network ad time. In 2014, Kars4Kids introduced a television commercial featuring the jingle.

The jingle has become the subject of public ridicule,  as critics have considered it to be an annoyance; it was described by San Francisco Chronicle journalist Peter Hartlaub as an "assault on [the] senses". On November 4, 2010, Don Imus was caught on a hot mic mocking a Kars4Kids ad during a commercial break of his radio show Imus in the Morning, telling the group to "go to hell" and jokingly blurting "I'll give you my Bentley, you moron." Imus later apologized. Vulture jokingly declared that the television version of the ad would bring end times.

The jingle has been referenced and parodied by multiple television series; in a December 2014 Saturday Night Live sketch satirizing talk show Charlie Rose and the Senate Intelligence Committee report on CIA torture, James Elmer Mitchell and Bruce Jessen (Bobby Moynihan and Kyle Mooney) told Rose (Taran Killam) that the Kars4Kids jingle was one of the CIA's other torture methods, alongside Time Warner Cable customer service and airport security screenings. The 2018 Will & Grace episode "Friends and Lover" featured a parody of the charity known as "Trucks4Tykes", which was portrayed as having a similarly annoying jingle. In the season four premiere episode of The Good Place, "A Girl From Arizona", the jingle is sung by several demons as the anthem of "The Bad Place." 

A 2018 episode of Last Week Tonight presented a song promoting China's Belt and Road Initiative performed by children, which host John Oliver likened to a "Kommunist Kars4Kids". After moving to a temporary studio in 2020 with a solid white backdrop, Oliver described the new set as being either "the place movie characters go when they've just died, or where they shot the Kars4Kids commercial". He also said the commercial was "the coronavirus of commercials, in that it is horrifically infectious and ruins people's lives."

Criticism
The organization has been criticized for inadequately disclosing its Jewish educational work. In 2009, Joy for Our Youth paid $65,000 in fines in Pennsylvania; while Kars4Kids paid $65,000 in fines in Oregon in settlements reached with the respective state attorneys general as a result of their contention that the organization had to state clearly that the beneficiaries were of a "certain religious affiliation." In Oregon, the attorney general added that Kars4Kids failed to disclose that its offer of a "free vacation" for vehicle donors was designed to recruit people to attend timeshare presentations.

In 2017, the Minnesota Attorney General conducted a compliance review and submitted a 300-page report to the Internal Revenue Service. The report found that 44% of funds raised by Kars4Kids went to program expenses, and most of that money had gone to its sister organization Oorah, whose concentration in New York and New Jersey meant only one Minnesota child was believed to have benefited from one of its programs in the years 2012–2014. The report also mentioned the charity had lost money in real estate investments in the financial crisis of 2008 and may have been a victim of losses from a Ponzi scheme.

Data breach
On November 3, 2018, Bob Diachenko, a cyber security researcher, discovered a publicly accessible MongoDB database that contained the emails and personal details of 21,612 Kars4Kids donors/customers plus super administrator password/login details. The database also contained a ransomware note that the files had been stolen and would be returned for bitcoin.

References

External links
 
 Oorah website
 Kars4Kids programs
 Kars4Kids official blog
 Kars4Kids pictures

Jewish organizations based in New Jersey
Non-profit organizations based in New Jersey
Jewish organizations based in Toronto
Non-profit organizations based in Toronto
Children's charities based in the United States
Lakewood Township, New Jersey